Quark Expeditions is an expedition travel company. The company offers Polar Region expeditions aboard purpose-built expedition ships and icebreakers.

History 
Quark Expeditions was founded in 1985 by Mike McDowell, initially specializing in small ship dive expeditions in many of the world's premier dive destinations McDowell soon moved to the Polar world where he had extensive prior experience as the Expedition Leader of MV Lindblad Explorer. 

In 1990/1991 McDowell chartered the vessel MV Frontier Spirit during its inaugural season of operations for several voyages which operated to Antarctica from Hobart, Australia & Bluff, New Zealand. After these successful voyages Mike McDowell offered Lars Wikander the opportunity to join him as a partner. 

In 1998, Mike McDowell decided to concentrate on his other adventure travel interests which included Adventure Network International, Deep Ocean Expeditions and Space Adventures and sold his interests to Lars Wikander, who then became the majority owner of the company. Three years later, Lars became chairman of the board, when Patrick Shaw joined the company as president and CEO.

In May 2007, the company became part of the UK-based TUI Travel PLC Group of Companies; subsequently in 2016, it became part of Travelopia, a division comprising some brands from the former TUI Specialist Group.

In 2012, the company advertised that it was offering the first "carbon-neutral" polar expeditions with the Ocean Diamond. The former RoRo ship uses Bunker C heavy-duty oil and one voyage produces an estimated 5,682 tons of CO2. The tour operator signed a contract with the centifier "The CarbonNeutral® Company", which uses Quark money to reforest forests in Turkey, Kenya, India and China, which will later be offset mathematically as CO2 sinks.

In 2016, the company mounted an expedition involving internet personalities and YouTube creators including Ben Brown, Tim Kellner and Tom Scott led by retired Canadian astronaut Chris Hadfield on an Arctic expedition.

The company's summer 2019 program in the Arctic included sailings to Greenland, Canada's High Arctic, the Northwest Passage and the North Pole.

Polar Fleet & Land Expeditions 
In 1991, Quark Expeditions was the first consumer led expedition to the North Pole. The company has the largest and most diverse fleet of passenger vessels in the Antarctic. Quark travel offers both cruise and land-based expeditions. Expeditions are held on the following ships:

Icebreakers

Ice-strengthened expedition vessels 

 Ultramarine

 Ocean Adventurer
 World Explorer

Sustainability & Charitable Initiatives 
Quark Expeditions is a long-time, active member of IAATO and AECO, and promotes various sustainability initiatives. In 2012, Ocean Diamond made a carbon-neutral voyage to Antarctica.

Recognitions 
Quark has received several industry awards, including some from Travel Weekly and National Geographic.

References

Travel and holiday companies of the United States
Expedition cruising
Cruise lines